Monty is a masculine given name, often a short form of Montgomery, Montague and other similar names. It is also a surname.

Notable people with the name or nickname include:

First name

Nickname
Bernard Montgomery (1887–1976), British Second World War field marshal
Bruce Montgomery (musical director) (1927–2008), American music composer and former director of the Penn Glee Club
Chris Montgomery (born 1972), American computer specialist and founder of the Xiph.Org Foundation
Colin Montgomerie (born 1963), Scottish golfer
Monty Montgomery (American football) (born 1973), former American football cornerback
Richard Montgomerie (1999–2007), Sussex cricketer
Monty Basgall (1922–2005), American Major League Baseball player and coach
Monty Berman (1905–2006), British cinematographer and film and television producer
Monty Bowden (1865–1892), English cricketer and wicket-keeper
Monty Burton (1918–1999), British pilot
Montgomery Clift (1920–1966), American actor
Montagu Corry, 1st Baron Rowton (1838–1903), British philanthropist and public servant, longtime private secretary to Benjamin Disraeli
Monty Don (born 1955), British horticulturist and television presenter
Monty Dumond (born 1982), South African rugby union player
Monty Kaser (1941–2009), American golfer
Monty Mason (born 1967), American politician
Monty Newborn (born 1938), American professor of electrical engineering and computer science
Monty Panesar (born 1982), England cricketer Mudhsuden Singh Panesar
Monty Roberts (born 1935), American horse trainer
Michael Widenius (born 1962), Finnish computer programmer, the main author of the open-source MySQL database and a founding member of the MySQL AB company
Monty Williams (born 1971), American National Basketball Association associate head coach and former player

Given name
Monty Sopp , American Pro Wrestler, more commonly known as Billy Gunn
Monty Alexander (born 1944), Jamaican jazz pianist
Monty Banks (1897–1950), Italian comedian and film producer born Mario Bianchi
Monty Beisel (born 1978), American National Football League player
Monty Betham (born 1978), New Zealand boxer and former rugby league footballer and junior world karate champion
Monty Brown (born 1970), American professional wrestler and National Football League player
Monte Collins (1898–1951), American film actor and screenwriter also credited as Monty Collins
Monty Fariss (born 1967), American baseball player
Monty Grow (born 1971), American football player
Monty Hall (1921–2017), Canadian-born television game show host Monte Halperin
Monty Halls (born 1966), English TV broadcaster, explorer and marine biologist
Monty Lewis (born 1963), American collegiate head football coach from c. the early 1980s to the present
Monty Lewis (1907–1997), Welsh-born American artist
Monty Montgomery (baseball) (born 1946), American Major League Baseball pitcher
Monty Montgomery (producer) (born 1963), American film producer, director, actor and screenwriter
Monty Norman (born Monty Noserovitch, 1928), British singer and film composer best known for composing the "James Bond Theme"
Monty Oum (1981–2015), American animator, director, and screenwriter
Monty Oxymoron (born 1961), stage name of Laurence Burrow, keyboardist for the English punk rock group The Damned
Monty Powell (born 1961), American country music songwriter
Monty Rice (born 1999), American football player

Fictional characters
A character on Sesame Street
Montgomery Montgomery, in the A Series of Unfortunate Events books, movie and series
A nickname for Montana Max, a Tiny Toon Adventures character
Monty, the cat in the Stuart Little films
Uncle Monty, in the film Withnail and I
Nickname of C. Montgomery Burns, evil billionaire on The Simpsons
Old Monty, in the 2003 remake of The Texas Chain Saw Massacre
Monty de la Cruz, a character in the Netflix series 13 Reasons Why
Monty Mole, the player character in a 1980s series of video games by the English company Gremlin Graphics
 Monty, a large red dump truck in Thomas and Friends, who debuted in the short-lived spin-off series, Jack and the Sodor Construction Company
Nickname of Monterey Jack, a character in the Chip 'n Dale Rescue Rangers animated television series
Dr. Monty, in the video game Call of Duty: Black Ops III
Monty Green, a main character in the TV show The 100
Monty, a vulture-like bird in the 2017 film Smurfs: The Lost Village
Monty Montahue, main character of the American comic strip Monty
Monty Richardson, title character of the short-lived Fox sitcom Monty, played by Henry Winkler
Monty Kirkham, in the film Big Fat Liar, played by Amanda Detmer
Birth name of Lightning McQueen, a racer in Pixar's Cars
Henry “Monty” Montague, a character from the novel The Gentleman's Guide to Vice and Virtue and its sequel The Lady's Guide to Petticoats and Piracy by Mackenzi Lee
Montgomery Gator (Monty) from the video game Five Nights at Freddy's: Security Breach
Monty, main character on the Zee Horror Show
Monty James, main character in Daddy’s Little Girls

Surname
Gloria Monty (1921–2006), American soap opera producer
Ole Monty (1908–1977), Danish film actor
Pete Monty (born 1974), American National Football League player
Rodolphe Monty (1874–1928), Canadian politician

See also
Monte (name), a given name and surname
Monti (given name)
Monti (surname)
Montie, a given name and surname

English masculine given names
English-language masculine given names
Hypocorisms